Matt McKillop is an American college basketball coach who is the head coach of the Davidson Wildcats men's basketball program of the Atlantic 10 Conference. He succeeded his father Bob who was the coach of the Wildcats for 33 years.

Playing career
McKillop was a three year starter at Davidson under his father Bob McKillop where he averaged 8.2 points per game and made two NCAA Tournament appearances. He initially signed to play professional basketball in the Czech Republic before suffering a knee injury.

Coaching career
Following one year as an assistant at Emory, McKillop joined his father's coaching staff as an assistant in 2008. Following his father's retirement in 2022, McKillop was named the head coach of Davidson.

Head coaching record

College

References

External links
 Davidson Profile

Living people
1983 births
American men's basketball coaches
American men's basketball players
Basketball players from North Carolina
College men's basketball head coaches in the United States
Davidson Wildcats men's basketball coaches
Davidson Wildcats men's basketball players
Emory Eagles men's basketball coaches
People from Davidson, North Carolina